Fork and Knife may refer to:

 Fork and Knife, two pieces of cutlery that are commonly used together
Fork and Knife Inn, Atlantic City, New Jersey, United States
"A Fork and Knife", a 1966 song by Kip Anderson, later covered by Dave Edmunds and Rockpile
"Fork and Knife", a song by Stan Ridgway from the 1966 album Black Diamond